Gary H. Pendleton (born 1947) is an American politician who served as a  Republican member of the North Carolina General Assembly from 2015 to 2017, representing the 49th district.

In 2020, Pendleton was charged with assault after an altercation with a poll worker during early voting for the presidential election.

Electoral history

2016

2014

References

External links

Living people
1947 births
21st-century American politicians
Republican Party members of the North Carolina House of Representatives